These American television shows premiered or were scheduled to premiere in 2019.

Shows

Miniseries

Television films and specials
These television films and specials are scheduled to premiere in 2019. The premiere dates may be changed depending on a variety of factors.

References

2019 in American television
2019-related lists
Mass media timelines by year